is a mountain of the Tanzawa Mountains, with an elevation of . Its summit marks the border between Sagamihara,  Kiyokawa  in Aikō District, and Yamakita in Ashigarakami District.

Gallery

References

 Geographical Survey Institute

Tanzawa
Sagamihara
Kiyokawa, Kanagawa
Yamakita, Kanagawa